Darcinópolis is a Brazilian municipality in the state of Tocantins. In 2020, the estimated population was 6,174. It has an area of 1,639 km².

References

Municipalities in Tocantins